The 2011 Cork Premier Intermediate Hurling Championship was the eighth staging of the Cork Premier Intermediate Hurling Championship since its establishment by the Cork County Board in 2004.

On 28 August 2011, Argideen Rangers were relegated from the championship following a 1-17 to 1-12 defeat by Watergrasshill.

On 9 October 2011, Courcey Rovers won the championship following a 0-15 to 1-9 defeat of Youghal in the final. It remains their only championship title in this grade.

Éamonn Collins from the Valley Rovers club was the championship's top scorer with 6-33.

Teams

A total of 16 teams contested the Premier Intermediate Championship, including 14 teams from the 2010 premier intermediate championship, one relegated from the 2010 senior championship and one promoted from the 2010 intermediate championship.

Team changes

To Championship

Promoted from the Cork Intermediate Hurling Championship
 Meelin

Relegated from the Cork Senior Hurling Championship
 Blarney

From Championship

Promoted to the Cork Senior Hurling Championship
 Ballymartle

Relegated to the Cork Intermediate Hurling Championship
 Fr. O’Neill’s

Results

Round 1

Round 2

Round 3

Relegation play-off

Round 4

Quarter-finals

Semi-finals

Final

Championship statistics

Scoring events

Widest winning margin: 25 points
Kilbrittain 5-15 – 0-05 Aghabullogue (Quarter-final replay)
Most goals in a match: 5
Kilbrittain 5-15 – 0-05 Aghabullogue (Quarter-final replay)
Most points in a match: 48
Ballincollig 2-20 – 1-22 Youghal (Round 1)
Most goals by one team in a match: 5
Kilbrittain 5-15 – 0-05 Aghabullogue (Quarter-final replay)
Most goals scored by a losing team: 3
Valley Rovers 3-06 – 0-19 Youghal (Quarter-final)
Most points scored by a losing team: 22 
Youghal 1-22 – 2-20 Ballincollig (Round 1)
Inniscarra 0-22 – 1-21 Kilbrittain (Round 2)

Top scorers

Top scorer overall

Top scorers in a single game

References

Cork Premier Intermediate Hurling Championship
Cork Premier Intermediate Hurling Championship